Mark Kidel (born 6 July 1947) is a documentary filmmaker, writer and critic, working mostly in France and the UK. His award-winning films include portraits of Cary Grant, John Adams (composer), Elvis Costello, Boy George, Ravi Shankar, Rod Stewart, Bill Viola, Iannis Xenakis, pianists Alfred Brendel and Leon Fleisher, Derek Jarman, Brian Clarke Balthus, Tricky, Robert Wyatt and American theatre and opera director Peter Sellars.

A pioneer of the "rockumentary", Kidel was also the first rock critic of the New Statesman and contributed pieces on rock, soul, and world music, to The Observer, The Sunday Times, and The Guardian.

Early life
Kidel grew up in Paris and Vienna and attended the Lycée français de Vienne and Bedales School in England. In 1965, he won a scholarship to the University of Oxford where he studied for a BA in Philosophy, Politics and Economics at New College, graduating in 1968, and edited Isis, the renowned student weekly. During his tenure, Kidel interviewed Jimi Hendrix on his first UK tour with Emma Rothschild. Kidel subsequently earned a scholarship to the University of Pennsylvania, graduating in 1969 with an MA in International Relations.

Early film and television career
In 1970 Kidel got a job at the BBC in London as a researcher in the General Features department. There he made his first 10-minute film (about cheap weekend holidays to Majorca), and in 1972 joined the production team on the newly formed BBC2 Saturday night program Full House later known as Second House and The Lively Arts. There he made longer film portraits of a variety of British artists and craftsmen.

He followed with the feature-length The Man They Couldn't Hang: Babbacombe Lee for the BBC with the folk-rock group Fairport Convention.

In 1975 Kidel made a cinéma vérité film about the Kursaal Flyers as they toured Britain in a Ford Transit van called So You Wanna Be a Rock 'N' Roll Star? Recognized as a pioneering rock doc (listed in Time Out'''s 50 Best Music Films, for example) this now classic inspired British comedians' group the Comic Strip's Bad News Tour which some believe in turn inspired Rob Reiner's This is Spinal Tap.Kidel's next film, another classic rock doc, Rod the Mod Has Come of Age was 'a ruthless account of the rock promotion circus in full action'. In early 1976, Kidel was in charge of "Arena: Art and Design", one of the precursors of the long-running BBC Arena series. During his six-month editorship, "Arena" featured an entire program devoted to video art, a then-relatively new art movement.

Dartington Hall and work with James Hillman
In 1976, frustrated by what he saw as television's increasing superficiality and the professional pressure to make formulaic films to please as wide an audience as possible, Kidel left the industry altogether to work in communications and public relations for the Dartington Hall Trust in Devon, a role he occupied for the next decade. Dorothy Whitney Elmhirst and her husband Leonard's non-profit foundation was influenced by Rabindranath Tagore and served as an experiment in rural reconstruction which included projects in education, agriculture, rural industry and the arts. Over this period, Kidel also taught in the music department at Dartington College of the Arts, for three years.

Kidel was director of the "New Themes for Education" conference held at Dartington Hall for the years from 1984 to 1986. During this time, the conference explored the experience of illness and brought together people from the worlds of medicine, psychology and the arts. The 1985 conference led to Kidel's co-editing with Susan Rowe-Leete,'The Meaning of Illness (Routledge and Kegan Paul, London, 1986).

Kidel invited James Hillman to Dartington Hall in 1984 to run a weekend seminar on animals in myths, dreams and fairy tales. Following this they collaborated, with Susan Rowe-Leete, on seven films based on Hillman's ideas:

-The Heart Has Reasons: a film about the way in which the heart is imagined by scientists and poets
-Kind of Blue: an essay in defence of melancholia
-The Architecture of the Imagination: a series of five ground-breaking films, 30-minutes each, about architecture and symbolism, with ones about the doorway, the staircase, the window, the tower and the bridge. The films included many examples drawn from the history of art and classic cinema.

Music criticism
From 1972 to 1976, Kidel wrote music reviews for Time Out's music section.

During his time in Devon and onwards, Kidel produced more writing on contemporary music, specifically rock, folk, soul, R&B, blues, and world music, contributing pieces to The Observer, The Sunday Times, The Guardian and the New Review. He was the founding rock columnist for the New Statesman in 1976 through 1980 and alternated every other week with John Peel on a regular column in The Listener.

WOMAD
Kidel and Peter Gabriel, with whom he had become friends after interviewing him for The Observer, discovered they were both interested in exploring music from other cultures. This led to a collaboration on the creation of a world music and rock festival that eventually became WOMAD.  Kidel fed ideas which came from looking at successful world music festivals in France, the yearly event in Rennes, run by Chérif Khaznadar and Françoise Gründ. Kidel was on the first board of directors but resigned owing to other commitments. A group that included Jonathan Arthur, Thomas Brooman, Martin Elbourne, Bob Hooton, and Steve Pritchard eventually brought the festival to fruition in 1982.

Return to television
In 1987, Kidel returned to television: That year, he worked as joint commissioning editor-in-chief for the inaugural broadcast of the French cultural channel La Sept – later known as ARTE France. He also worked as a consultant to Channel 4, BBC Wales, and United Television, a large UK-based independent producer of TV programmes, through 2004. Kidel also produced and directed many films from 1987 until the present, working in collaboration with a number of production companies, in the UK – Dibb Directions, Third Eye and Antelope Films – in France with Les Films d'ici, and Agat Films & Cie – Ex Nihilo and also a regular guest producer with the BBC's Music and Arts Department.

One notable project involved collaborating with British producer and director Mike Dibb and the world-renowned American ethnomusicologist Alan Lomax – creating two films for Channel 4 out of 500 or so hours of material he had shot in the United States over a 10-year period: American Patchwork and Dreams and Songs of the Noble Old.

Many of Kidel's most successful films in the field of world music and cultures have been the result of collaborations with distinguished specialists: Le Paris Black and Pygmies in Paris with French music writer (and ex-editor of Jazz Magazine) Gérald Arnaud,
Under African Skies: Mali and Bamako Beat with ethnomusicologist and BBC broadcaster Lucy Durán
, and New York:, The Secret African City with the Yale Africanist Robert Farris Thompson.

Move to role as self-shooting director
A major shift occurred in Kidel's work starting in 1997: he started shooting his own films. The intimacy achieved in "Naked and Famous", his film about Tricky, owed a great deal to this new low-impact approach. Subsequently, Kidel shot many of his own films or the parts of them using this approach.

Current work
Kidel founded the production company Calliope Media in 2003. Calliope Media was renamed Mark Kidel Films in 2022. He continues to work as a freelance director, mainly in the UK and France. Recent films include Becoming Cary Grant (2017), an official selection at the 2017 Cannes Festival, The Juilliard Experiment (2016), a feature-length film about the French artist Fabienne Verdier's collaborations with musicians in New York. Current projects include a feature documentary about Leonard Cohen, co-written with Sylvie Simmons, author of the acclaimed biography and 'I'm You Man,  a film about the French pianist Shani Diluka as well as other music and arts projects. He is an active freelance writer, notably writing for Dasha Zhukova's art magazine Garage and Doris Lippitsch's architecture and design magazine QUER. He is a regular contributor on music, film and theatre for The Arts Desk, an online review of the arts founded in September 2009 by a group of freelance arts writers.

Selected awards
 Grierson Award for the Best History Documentary, 2007, for Hungary 1956: Our Revolution
 FIPA D'Argent Special Prize, Biarritz, 2002, for Ravi Shankar: Between Two Worlds 
 Grand Prix, Classiques en Images festival, Paris, 2002, for Leon Fleisher: Lessons of a Master
 Royal Television Society Award, 1995, for Kind of Blue
 Liliane Stewart Prize for Design Arts, Festival International du Film Sur L'art, Montreal, 2011, for the documentary "Colouring Light: Brian Clarke – An Artist Apart"

Personal life
Kidel has been married twice. His first marriage was to Caroline Wyndham, who had a daughter Sarah, whom Kidel adopted. The couple subsequently had Leo and Chloe. His second marriage was to Susan Rowe-Leete, from whom he was divorced in 2018. They have two children, Sam and Anna.

Filmography

75 min and over 
Becoming Cary Grant', 2017, 85 min, Official Selection Cannes Festival 2017 The Juilliard Experiment, 2016, 90 min Elvis Costello: Mystery Dance, 2013, 90 minSet the Piano Stool on Fire, 2010, 77 minJourney With Peter Sellars, 2007, 90 min – Telluride Film Festival selection, 2007; San Francisco International Film Festival selection, 2008; Golden Prague nomination, 2008Soweto Strings, 2007, 89 min – Best Arts Documentary nomination, Grierson Awards, 2007Soweto Strings In Performance, 2007 – Selection FIPA, Biarritz ; DokuArts, Amsterdam, both 2008Paris Brothel, 2003, 75 minGlastonbury, 2002, 2 hrsRavi Shankar: Between Two Worlds, 2001, 90 min – Telluride Film Festival selection, 2001; FIPA D'Argent Special Prize; Grand Prix du Documentaire, UNESCO Festival International du Film d'Art; World Culture Forum Vienna TV Award; Newport International Film Festival; San Francisco International Film Festival, all 2002 Alfred Brendel: Man and Mask, 2000, 75 minLes Hopitaux Meurent Aussi (A Hospital Remembers), 2000, 77 min – Selection Hot Docs, TorontoRod the Mod Has Come Of Age (Rod Stewart), 1976, 90 minSo You Wanna Be A Rock’n’Roll Star (The Kursaal Flyers), 1975, 90 minThe Man They Couldn’t Hang: Babbacombe Lee, 1974, 90 min

 60 min Martin Amis's England, 2014Road Movie: A Portrait of John Adams, 2013 Selection at FIFA (Montreal), 2013 and Telluride Film Festival, 2013 Fabienne Verdier: Painting the Moment, 2013Colouring Light: Brian Clarke – An Artist Apart, 2011Saved By Music: The Wallfisch Family, 2010Leon Fleisher: A Fleur De Touches (Two Hands), 2007Hungary 1956: Our Revolution, 2006 – Grierson Award for Best History Documentary; Historical Film of the Year Award, History Today Awards, both 2007Mario Lanza: Singing to the Gods, 2005Susheela Raman: Indian Journey, 2005Joe Zawinul: A Musical Portrait, 2005Imber: England's Lost Village, 2004Bill Viola: The Eye of the Heart, 2003 – Selection FIFA, Montreal, 2004Free Will and Testament: The Robert Wyatt Story, 2002Ravi Shankar In Concert, 2002Leon Fleisher: Lessons Of a Master, 2001 – Classiques en Images festival Grand Prix, 2002; Grand Prix Musique, UNESCO Festival International du Film d'Art, 2002Naked and Famous: Tricky, 1997Wild Ballerina: Karole Armitage, 1997Balthus the Painter, 1996 – Biennale Internationale du Film sur l'Art, Paris, official selection, 1996; FIFA, Montreal, 1997Norman Foster, 1995Edgard Varèse, 1995 – Selection  FIFA, Montreal, 1997Boy Next Door (Boy George), 1994 – Selection FIFA, Montreal, 1995Derek Jarman: A Portrait, 1991 – Selection FIFA, Montreal, 1992Something Rich and Strange: The Life and Work Of Iannis Xenakis, 1991Le Paris Black, 1990 – Selection Suoni dal Mondo, Firenze, 1998Under African Skies: Algeria, 1989Under African Skies: Mali, 1989 – Selection Suoni dal Mondo, Firenze, 1998Under African Skies: Rai, 1989 – Selection Suoni dal Mondo, Firenze, 1998New York: The Secret African City, 1989Songs and Dreams Of the Noble Old, 1988American Patchwork, 1988

 50 and 52 min The Island of 1000 Violins, 2015, 52 minBrendel In Performance, 2000, 50 minTricky Live, 1997, 50 minJust Dancing Around: Richard Alston, 1996, 52 minDreamtown: An Anatomy of Blackpool, 1995, 50 min – Golden Gate Awards Certificate of Merit, San Francisco International Film Festival, 1996Kind Of Blue: An Essay On Melancholia and Depression, 1994, 52 min – Telluride Film Festival selection, 1993The Heart Has Reasons, 1993, 52 minPygmies In Paris, 1992, 45 minBamako Beat: Music From Mali, 1991, 50 minSounds Off the Beaten Track: WOMAD, 1987, 52 min

 30 min and less Henri Oguike: Second Frame, 2006, 26 minKarole Armitage: Rave, 2003, 26 minThe Architecture of the Imagination, 1994: The Door, The Staircase, The Window, The Bridge, and The Tower (5 films, 30 min each)

CollaborationsA Maybe Day in Kazakhstan, co-directed with Tony Harrison – Telluride Film Festival selection, 1994Alfred Brendel on Music: Three Lectures, 2011, 225 min

BooksDartington (Webb & Bower, Exeter, 1983)Learning By Doing (Green Books, Hartland)

 Co-authored with Susan Rowe-Leete The Meaning of Illness (Routledge and Kegan Paul, London, 1986)
The photo essay "Mapping the Body" in Zone 3: Fragments for a History of the Human Body, Part 1'', ed. by Michel Feher (Zone Books, 1989)

References

External links
Kidel's obituary of James Hillman in The Guardian
Short biography on Calliope Media website
Full biography on Calliope Media website
Contributor's page on The Arts Desk website

A sequence in Rod the Mod Has Come of Age that shows Stewart having fun with an inept radio journalist
Clips from Naked and Famous
Clips from A Hospital Remembers, another film shot on a Sony DCR-VX1000 camera

English documentary filmmakers
English television people
English music critics
1947 births
Alumni of New College, Oxford
Film people from Bristol
Living people